Richard Newell may refer to:

King Biscuit Boy (Richard A. Newell), Canadian blues musician
Dick Newell (Richard G. Newell), British businessman and technologist
Richard G. Newell (born 1965), American energy and climate economist

See also
Rick Newell (Gordon Richard Newell), Canadian ice hockey player